Calambus is a genus of beetles belonging to the family Elateridae.

The genus was first described by Thomson in 1859.

The species of this genus are found in Europe and Japan.

Species:
 Calambus bipustulatus (Linnaeus, 1767)

References

Elateridae
Elateridae genera